The 1930–31 Football League season was Birmingham Football Club's 35th in the Football League and their 18th in the First Division. They finished in 19th position in the 22-team division, five points clear of the relegation places. They also competed in the 1930–31 FA Cup, entering at the third round proper and reaching the final for the first time in the club's history. They lost 2–1 to Second Division club West Bromwich Albion.

Twenty-seven players made at least one appearance in nationally organised competition, and there were eleven different goalscorers. Forward Ernie Curtis played in 47 of the 49 matches over the season, and, for the 10th successive year, Joe Bradford was leading scorer, with 22 goals in all competitions, of which 14 came in the league. George Briggs scored more league goals, with 15.

The 9–1 defeat away to Sheffield Wednesday on 13 December equalled the club record for widest margin of defeat.

Football League First Division

League table (part)

FA Cup

Birmingham "won finely" at Anfield to defeat Liverpool 2–0, then eliminated Port Vale and, with Ernie Curtis "in magnificent form", Watford, to reach the sixth round in which they played Chelsea. Playing in a blizzard at St Andrew's, Chelsea took the lead and had a second goal disallowed before the change of ends brought a change of fortunes. George Briggs crossed for Joe Bradford's header, then Briggs and Bradford combined for Curtis to put Birmingham ahead. With ten minutes left, a misplaced clearance by Bob Gregg allowed Jackie Crawford to equalise. The replay at Stamford Bridge, before a ground-record crowd of 74,365 with thousands more locked out, remained goalless until Chelsea half-backs John Townrow and Sid Bishop were injured. With no substitutes permitted, Birmingham took advantage, winning the tie 3–0 with goals from Jack Firth and two from Bradford. Curtis opened the scoring half an hour into the semi-final against First Division Sunderland. Sunderland's players thought they should have had a penalty, they failed to take numerous chances, and Harry Hibbs made some fine saves, but three minutes from time, Curtis had a shot blocked, Bradford "rushed in to help his colleague and between them they scored the second goal".

After six minutes of the final, Bob Gregg's header from Jimmy Cringan's free kick was ruled offside; newspaper reports suggest the decision was incorrect. After 24 minutes, Ned Barkas deflected W. G. Richardson's shot away from Hibbs and Richardson steered it home. Chances were missed by both sides before Joe Bradford equalised with a  shot. But straight from the restart, Albion ran the ball down the field, George Liddell sliced his clearance to Richardson's feet, and the forward scored from close range.

Appearances and goals

See also
Birmingham City F.C. seasons

References
General
 Matthews, Tony (1995). Birmingham City: A Complete Record. Breedon Books (Derby). .
 Matthews, Tony (2010). Birmingham City: The Complete Record. DB Publishing (Derby). .
 Source for match dates and results: "Birmingham City 1930–1931: Results". Statto Organisation. Retrieved 12 May 2012.
 Source for lineups, appearances, goalscorers and attendances: Matthews (2010), Complete Record: pp. 302–03.
 Source for kit: "Birmingham City". Historical Football Kits. Retrieved 22 May 2018.

Specific

Birmingham City F.C. seasons
Birmingham